Ludwig Rieder (born 19 June 1991) is an Italian luger.

Rieder was born in Brixen, Italy, and competed in the Men's double luge event at the 2014 Winter Olympics in Sochi as a pair with Patrick Rastner.  The duo finished in seventh place.

In the open double luge event at the 2018 Winter Olympics in PyeongChang, Rieder and Rastner placed 15th.

References

External links
 

Italian male lugers
Living people
Sportspeople from Brixen
Italian lugers
Lugers at the 2014 Winter Olympics
Lugers at the 2018 Winter Olympics
Olympic lugers of Italy
1991 births